Metachanda benoistella is a moth species in the oecophorine tribe Metachandini. It was described by Pierre Viette in 1955. Its type locality is on Madagascar.

References

Oecophorinae
Moths described in 1955
Taxa named by Pierre Viette
Moths of Africa